Marcel André Guénin (born 1937) is a theoretical physicist and mathematician, and Professor Emeritus of the University of Geneva.

He obtained his PhD in 1962 at the University of Geneva under the supervision of Ernst Stueckelberg with a thesis titled "Opérateurs de champ antilinéaires, T- et CP-covariance".

From 1983 to 1987 he was Rector of the University of Geneva.

Jean-Pierre Eckmann was one of his PhD students.

References

1937 births
Living people
Swiss physicists
Theoretical physicists
Swiss mathematicians
Academic staff of the University of Geneva
University of Geneva alumni
Rectors of the University of Geneva